Lyrical Sympathy is the debut EP by Versailles, released on October 31, 2007. It was released simultaneously in Japan and Europe, which is unusual for a newly formed band.

Two of their songs, "The Red Carpet Day" and "Sympathia", were rerecorded in their fifth-anniversary single "Rose" and their self-titled album Versailles, respectively.

Track listing

References

Versailles (band) EPs
2007 debut EPs
Japanese-language EPs